The individual eventing at the 1960 Summer Olympics took place between 6 and 10 September. Eventing was open to men only. It was the 10th appearance of the event.

For the first time since 1924, the eventing team consisted of 4 riders rather than 3. Although 19 nations, with a total of 79 riders, competed, the eventing competition at the 1960 Olympics clearly went to the Australians. The team had fantastic performances cross-country, with three of the four riders (Lawrence "Laurie" Morgan, Neale Lavis, and Brian Crago) in the top three spots of the competition following endurance day. Bill Roycroft, the fourth Australian team member, had fallen on cement drain pipes, resulting in a concussion and broken collar bone. Unfortunately, Brian Crago's mount Sabre was rejected at the final horse inspection, removing him from his current silver-medal position. In order to insure his team finished, Roycroft left the hospital to ride in the final phase, posting a clear round and insuring a team gold for his country.

Competition format
The team and individual eventing competitions used the same results. Eventing consisted of a dressage test, a cross-country test, and a jumping test. The competitor with the best total score (fewest penalty points) won.

 Dressage: The eventing competition featured a dressage test.
 Cross-country: The cross-country test had five phases.
 Phase A: 7.24 km roads. Time allowed was 30 minutes, 10 seconds (240 m/min). 
 Phase B: 3.6 km steeplechase. Time allowed was 6 minutes (600 m/min). A penalty of 0.8 points was incurred for each second above that time. A bonus of 0.8 points could be earned for each second under that time, to a maximum of 37.6 points at 5 minutes, 13 seconds (47 seconds under).
 Phase C: 13.44 km roads. Time allowed was 60 minutes (240 m/min). A penalty of 1 point was incurred for each second above that time.
 Phase D: 8.1 km cross-country. Time allowed was 18 minutes (450 m/min). A penalty of 0.4 points was incurred for each second above that time. A bonus of 0.4 points could be earned for each second under that time, to a maximum of 90.8 points at 14 minutes, 13 seconds (3 minutes, 47 seconds under).
 Phase E: 1.98 km flat. Time allowed was 6 minutes (330 m/min). A penalty of 1 point was incurred for each second above that time.
 Jumping: There was an 800-meter jumping test, with a maximum time of 2 minutes. Penalties were incurred for going over the time or for obstacle faults.

Results

73 riders competed.

Standings after dressage

Standings after cross-country

Final results after jumping

References

Equestrian at the 1960 Summer Olympics